The Minister for Sport is a minister in the Government of New South Wales with responsibilities for the administration and support for all sporting bodies in the state of New South Wales, Australia. It has often been combined with other portfolio responsibilities, most commonly Tourism.

List of ministers
The following individuals have served as minister where sport was one of the responsibilities in the portfolio:

See also 

List of New South Wales government agencies

Notes

References

External links 
New South Wales Office of Sport – Sport and Recreation

Sport
Sport in New South Wales